Dolní Bezděkov is a municipality and village in Chrudim District in the Pardubice Region of the Czech Republic. It has about 200 inhabitants.

Notable people
Václav Rabas (1933–2015), organist

References

External links

Villages in Chrudim District